The 1995–96 Eintracht Frankfurt season was the 96th season in the club's football history. In 1995–96 the club played in the Bundesliga, the top tier of German football. It was the club's 33rd season in the Bundesliga and ended with the first relegation in club history.

Friendlies

Indoor soccer tournaments

Dortmund

Competitions

Bundesliga

League table

Results by round

Matches

DFB-Pokal

UEFA Intertoto Cup

Squad

Squad and statistics 

|}

Notes

References

Sources

External links
 Official English Eintracht website 
 German archive site
 1995–96 Bundesliga season at Fussballdaten.de 

1995-96
German football clubs 1995–96 season